Rychnov  may refer to several places in the Czech Republic:

Rychnov nad Kněžnou, a town in Hradec Králové Region
Rychnov nad Kněžnou District, a district within Hradec Králové Region
Nový Rychnov, a market town in Pelhřimov District, Vysočina Region
Dolní Rychnov, a village and municipality in Sokolov District, Karlovy Vary Region
Rychnov na Moravě, a village and municipality in Svitavy District, Pardubice Region
Rychnov u Jablonce nad Nisou, a town in Jablonec nad Nisou District, Liberec Region

See also
Reichenau (disambiguation)